Copper Basin is a basin located between the Copper Mountains and Fox Creek Range of northern Elko County, Nevada, United States. The basin, located on the border of the Mountain City and Jarbidge ranger districts within the Humboldt-Toiyabe National Forest, is known for its displays of wildflowers during early summer. It is accessed via Elko County Route 748, also known as Charleston-Jarbidge Road, by way of either Charleston or Jarbidge.

References 

Landforms of Elko County, Nevada
Humboldt–Toiyabe National Forest
Basins of Nevada